Taíno is an extinct Arawakan language that was spoken by the Taíno people of the Caribbean. At the time of Spanish contact, it was the most common language throughout the Caribbean. Classic Taíno (Taíno proper) was the native language of the Taíno tribes living in the northern Lesser Antilles, Puerto Rico, the Turks and Caicos Islands, and most of Hispaniola, and expanding into Cuba. The Ciboney dialect is essentially unattested, but colonial sources suggest it was very similar to Classic Taíno, and was spoken in the westernmost areas of Hispaniola, the Bahamas, Jamaica, and most of Cuba.

By the late 15th century, Taíno had displaced earlier languages, except in western Cuba and pockets in Hispaniola. As the Taíno culture declined during Spanish colonization, the language was replaced by Spanish and other European languages, like English and French. It is believed to have been extinct within 100 years of contact, but possibly continued to be spoken in isolated pockets in the Caribbean until the late 19th century. As the first indigenous language encountered by Europeans in the New World, it was a major source of new words borrowed into European languages.

Dialects
Granberry & Vescelius (2004) distinguish two dialects, one on Hispaniola and further east, and the other on Hispaniola and further west.

 Classic (Eastern) Taíno, spoken in Classic Taíno and Eastern Taíno cultural areas. These were the Lesser Antilles north of Guadeloupe, Puerto Rico, central Hispaniola, and the Turks & Caicos (from an expansion in ca. 1200). Classic Taíno was expanding into eastern and even central Cuba at the time of the Spanish Conquest, perhaps from people fleeing the Spanish in Hispaniola.
 Ciboney (Western) Taíno, spoken in Ciboney and Lucayan cultural areas. These were most of Cuba, Jamaica, Haiti, and the Bahamas.

Columbus wrote that "...from Bahama to Cuba, Boriquen to Jamaica, the same language was spoken in various slight dialects, but understood by all."

Phonology
The Taíno language was not written. The Taínos used petroglyphs, but there has been little research in the area. The following phonemes are reconstructed from Spanish records:

The  realization occurred at the beginning of a word and the  realization occurred between vowels.

The  is written ei or final é in modern reconstructions.

There was a parallel set of nasal vowels.

Consonant clusters were not permitted in the onset of syllables. One exception was the suffix -(e)l, which indicated the masculine gender, as in warokoel "our grandfather". Some words are recorded as ending in x, which may have represented a word-final  sound.

Grammar
Taíno is not well attested. 
However, from what can be gathered, nouns appear to have had noun-class suffixes, as in other Arawakan languages. Attested Taíno possessive prefixes are da- 'my', wa- 'our', li- 'his' (sometimes with a different vowel), and to-, tu- 'her'.

Recorded conjugated verbs include daka ("I am"), waibá ("we go" or "let us go"), warikẽ ("we see"), kãma ("hear", imperative), ahiyakawo ("speak to us") and makabuka ("it is not important").

Verb-designating affixes were a-, ka-, -a, -ka, -nV in which "V" was an unknown or changeable vowel. This suggests that, like many other Arawakan languages, verbal conjugation for a subject resembled the possessive prefixes on nouns. The negating prefix was ma- and the attributive prefix was ka-. Hence makabuka meant "it is not important". The buka element has been compared to the Kalinago suffix -bouca which designates the past tense. Hence, makabuka can be interpreted as meaning "it has no past". However, the word can also be compared to the Kalinago verb aboúcacha meaning "to scare". This verb is shared in various Caribbean Arawakan languages such as Lokono (bokaüya 'to scare, frighten') and Parauhano (apüüta 'to scare'). In this case makabuka would mean "it does not frighten [me]".

Masculine gender was indicated by the noun suffix -(e)l. There is no known corresponding feminine suffix.

Vocabulary
Taíno borrowed words from Spanish, adapting them to its phonology. These include isúbara ("sword", from espada), isíbuse ("mirror", from espejo) and Dios (the Christian God, from Dios). 

English words derived from Taíno include: barbecue, caiman, canoe, cassava, cay, guava, hammock, hurricane, hutia, iguana, macana, maize, manatee, mangrove, maroon, potato, savanna, and tobacco.

Taíno loanwords in Spanish include: agutí, ají, auyama, batata, cacique, caoba, guanabana, guaraguao, jaiba, loro, maní,  maguey (also rendered magüey), múcaro, nigua, querequequé, tiburón, and tuna, as well as the previous English words in their Spanish form: barbacoa, caimán, canoa, casabe, cayo, guayaba, hamaca, huracán, iguana, jutía, macana, maíz, manatí, manglar, cimarrón, patata, sabana, and tabaco.

Place names
Place names of Taíno origin include:

 Haiti: ha-yi-ti 'land of mountains'
 Quisqueya (Hispaniola): kis-ke-ya 'great thing' or 'native land'
 Bahamas: ba-ha-ma 'large-upper-middle'
 Bimini: bimini 'twins'
 Inagua: i-na-wa 'small eastern land'
 Caicos: ka-i-ko 'nearby northern outlier'
 Boriquén (Puerto Rico, also rendered Borikén, Borinquen): borĩkẽ, borĩ ("native") -kẽ ("land") 'native land'
 Jamaica: Ya-mah-ye-ka 'great spirit of the land of man'
 Cayman Islands: kaimã 'crocodile' or 'alligator'
 Cuba: cu-bao 'great fertile land'

Sample sentences
Six sentences of spoken Taíno were preserved. They are presented first in the original orthography in which they were recorded, then in a regularized orthography based on the reconstructed language and lastly in their English translation:

<div style="overflow:auto;">

References

Bibliography
 Payne D.L., "A classification of Maipuran (Arawakan) languages based on shared lexical retentions", in: Derbyshire D.C., Pullum G.K. (eds.), Handbook of Amazonian Languages, vol. 3, Berlin, 1991.
 Derbyshire D.C., "Arawakan languages", in: Bright, William (ed.), International Encyclopedia of Linguistics, vol. 1, New York, 1992.

 
Arawakan languages
Indigenous languages of the Caribbean
Extinct languages of North America
Languages of the Bahamas
Languages of Cuba
Languages of Haiti
Languages of the Dominican Republic
Languages of the Turks and Caicos Islands
Languages of Jamaica
Languages of Puerto Rico
Languages of the United States Virgin Islands
Languages of the British Virgin Islands
Languages of Saint Kitts and Nevis
Languages of Anguilla
Languages of Saint Martin (island)
Languages of Antigua and Barbuda
Languages of Montserrat
Languages extinct in the 16th century
Indigenous languages of the United States